HNLMS Evertsen was a  of the Royal Netherlands Navy. She was destroyed by ships of the Imperial Japanese Navy on 1 March 1942, during the Battle of Sunda Strait.

Design
In the mid-1920s, the Netherlands placed orders for four new destroyers to be deployed to the East Indies. They were built in Dutch shipyards to a design by the British Yarrow Shipbuilders, which was based on the destroyer , which Yarrow had designed and built for the British Royal Navy.

The ship's main gun armament was four  guns built by the Swedish company Bofors, mounted two forward and two aft, with two  anti-aircraft guns mounted amidships. Four 12.7 mm machine guns provided close-in anti-aircraft defence. The ship's torpedo armament comprised six  torpedo tubes in two triple mounts, while 24 mines could also be carried. To aid search operations, the ship carried a Fokker C.VII-W floatplane on a platform over the aft torpedo tubes, which was lowered to the sea by a crane for flight operations.

Service history
The ship was laid down on 5 August 1925, at the Burgerhout's Scheepswerf en Machinefabriek in Rotterdam, and launched on 29 December 1926. The ship was commissioned on 12 April 1928.

She and her sister De Ruyter left the Netherlands on 27 September 1928, for the Dutch East Indies.

At Tanjung Priok the ships waited for the royal yacht Maha Chakri of the king of Siam and the destroyer Phra Ruang. After this the ships, without the submarines, visited Bangka, Belitung, Riau, Lingga Islands, Belawan, and Deli. On 28 August, they returned in Tanjung Priok. On 31 August, she participates in a fleet review at Tanjung Priok, held in honor of the Dutch Queen Wilhelmina of the Netherlands, who was born that day. Other ships that participated in the review where the destroyer De Ruyter and the cruiser Java.

While practicing with the cruiser , De Ruyter, and five submarines, Sumatra stranded on an uncharted reef near the island Kebatoe, on 14 May 1931.

Before the visit they had practiced in the South China Sea.

World War II

From 1940 to 1942, she served as a convoy escort, mainly in the Dutch East Indies.  At the end of February 1942, in the aftermath of the Battle of the Java Sea, Evertsen (Luitenant ter zee W. M. De Vries, commanding), was ordered to escape from Tanjung Priok to Tjilatjap via the Sunda Strait, in company with the Australian light cruiser HMAS Perth and the American heavy cruiser USS Houston. Perth and Houston departed at 19:00 on 28 February, but Evertsen was delayed, leaving port two hours later.

The route through the Strait had earlier been reported clear by Allied intelligence, but unfortunately a Japanese invasion fleet with its close covering force of two heavy cruisers, one light cruiser and nine destroyers had started landing troops that night in Banten Bay, at the eastern end of Sunda Strait.  Perth and Houston ran into this force, and in a ferocious night action that ended after midnight on 1 March, both ships were sunk.

Evertsen was attempting to catch up with Houston and Perth. Her crew sighted the gunfire of the main action, and managed to evade the Japanese main force. However, Evertsen was then engaged by two Japanese destroyers (Murakumo and Shirakumo) in the Strait, and on fire and in a sinking condition, grounded herself on a reef near Sebuku Island. The surviving crew abandoned ship just as the aft magazine exploded and blew off the stern; they were taken prisoner by the Japanese on 9–10 March 1942.

References

Bibliography
 Gardiner, Robert and Roger Chesneau. Conway's All The World's Fighting Ships 1922–1946. London: Conway Maritime Press 1980. . 
 Whitley, M.J. Destroyers of World War Two: An International Encyclopedia. London: Cassell & Co, 2000. .

Admiralen-class destroyers
Ships built in Rotterdam
1926 ships
World War II destroyers of the Netherlands
World War II shipwrecks in the Pacific Ocean
Maritime incidents in March 1942
Naval magazine explosions